Macnaghten may refer to:

Clan Macnaghten
Daniel M'Naghten, namesake of the M'Naghten rules
Edward Macnaghten
Elliot Macnaghten
Half Hung MacNaghten
Macnaghten Baronets
Melville Macnaghten
William Hay Macnaghten (1793-1841), killed in the First Anglo-Afghan War

See also
 Macnaughtan
 McNaughton